The Ministry of Industry and Commerce is the government ministry responsible for governing and developing industrial activity and commercial activity in Laos.  It is responsible for regulating and promoting manufacturing, trade, import and export activity, and for representing Laos and Laotian interests in the international business community.

Ministry main offices are located in Vientiane.

See also
 Economy of Laos
 Government of Laos
 List of company registers

References

External links
Ministry of Industry and Commerce

Ministries of the Government of Laos
Economy of Laos
Laos
Laos
Vientiane